Acaena pinnatifida, the Argentinian biddy-biddy, is a species of perennial plant.

Subspecies
Acaena pinnatifida is often discussed as comprising several varieties. These include:

Acaeana pinnatifida var. californica which is found in coastal scrub areas in California.  It is a perennial herb that is native to California and is endemic (limited) to California alone.  It can be found at elevations ranging from 164 to 1,312 feet.

External links
  Acaena pinnatifida Jepson Manual Profile

pinnatifida
Flora of California
Taxa named by José Antonio Pavón Jiménez
Flora without expected TNC conservation status